Todd Haberkorn is an American voice actor and director, who has dubbed in anime, films, and video games.

Career 
While Haberkorn was working in theater, he joined Funimation as a voice actor, with minor roles in One Piece, Black Cat, and Peach Girl. Since then, he has voiced characters such as Natsu Dragneel in Fairy Tail, Italy in Hetalia: Axis Powers, Hikaru Hitachiin in Ouran High School Host Club, Allen Walker in D.Gray-man, Death the Kid in Soul Eater, Tsukune Aono in Rosario + Vampire, Kimihiro Watanuki in xxxHolic, and Yamato Akitsuki in Suzuka. He has also worked in Los Angeles as an actor, director, producer and writer.

He also played Aru Akise, one of the main set of characters in Future Diary and provided the English dub voice for Hiroki Hasegawa in Shin Godzilla, as well as Razor for Genshin Impact.

Personal life 
Haberkorn is of partial Vietnamese descent on the maternal side of his family, while his father's side of the family is of Scandinavian descent.
Haberkorn married Bonnie Vanwinkle on February 29, 2008. They divorced on November 19, 2010. He has one son from a previous relationship, who was born in 2004. In 2021, he married his girlfriend, Nicole Corona.

Filmography

Anime
{| class="wikitable sortable plainrowheaders"
|+ List of dubbed voice performances in anime
! Year
! Title
! Role
! class="unsortable"| Notes
! class="unsortable"| Source
|-

|  || Black Cat || Flitt Morris ||  || Voice123
|-
|  || Crayon Shin-chan || The Flamer || Funimation dub || 
|-
|  || AM Driver || Jenath Dira || || Resume
|-
|  || Beet the Vandel Buster || Jikku || || Resume
|-
|  || One Piece || Koza, Siam || Funimation dub || 
|-
|  || Suzuka || Yamato Akitsuki || First major role || Resume
|-
|  || Tsubasa Reservoir Chronicle || Kimihiro Watanuki || || CA
|-
|  || Mushishi || Nagi || Ep. 6 || 
|-
| –2008 || School Rumble || Kentaro Nara || || CA
|-
|  || Glass Fleet || Magnus, others || Assistant ADR Director || CA
|-
|  || Shuffle! || Itsuki Midoriba || ADR Director || Tweet
|-
|  || xxxHolic || Kimihiro Watanuki || || CA
|-
|  || Sasami: Magical Girls Club || Monta || || 
|-
|  || Claymore || Raki || ADR Director || 
|-soul eater death the kid
|  || Ghost Hunt || Kazuya Shibuya || || Resume
|-
|  || The Tower of Druaga series || Jil || || Resume
|-
|  || Ouran High School Host Club || Hikaru Hitachiin || || CA
|-
| –2018 ||D.Gray-man || Allen Walker || Co-Assistant ADR Director || Resume
|-
|  || Baccano! || Firo Prochainezo || || 
|-
|  || Big Windup! || Yuichiro Tajima || || 
|-
|  || Sgt. Frog || Keroro || || Resume
|-
|  || Blassreiter || Joseph Jobson || || Resume
|-
|  || Rin: Daughters of Mnemosyne || Apos || || 
|-
|  || Eden of the East || Jintaro Tsuji || || 
|-
|  || Strike Witches || Meyer || || CA
|-
|  || Sands of Destruction || Kyrie Ilnis || || Resume
|-
|  || Soul Eater || Death the Kid || || 
|-
|  || Initial D series || Keisuke Takahashi || Funimation dub || 
|-
|  || Fullmetal Alchemist: Brotherhood || Ling Yao || || Resume
|-
|  || Dragon Ball Z Kai || Android 19 || || Resume
|-
|  || My Bride Is a Mermaid || Nagasumi Michishio || || Resume
|-
|  || Hetalia: Axis Powers series || Italy || || Resume
|-
|  || Sekirei || Hayato Mikogami || || 
|-
|  || Ga-Rei: Zero || Kensuke Nimura || Ep. 12 || 
|-
||  || Black Butler series || Viscount Druitt || || 
|-
|  || Phantom: Requiem for the Phantom || Atsushi Motegi || || 
|-
|  || Baka and Test || Kyoji Nemoto || || 
|-
| –2019 || Fairy Tail || Natsu Dragneel || || 
|-
|  || Chaos;Head || Takumi Nishijo || || 
|-
|  || Rosario + Vampire series || Tsukune Aono || || 
|-
|  || Okami-san and Her Seven Companions || Taro Urashima || || 
|-
|  || Shiki || Masao Murasako || || 
|-
|  || Fractale || Colin || || 
|-
|  || Shangri-La || Soichiro Hata || || 
|-
|  || Nura: Rise of the Yokai Clan series || Kubinashi || As Todd Stone || 
|-
|  || Aria the Scarlet Ammo || Kinji Toyama || Also AA || 
|-
|  || C || Kimimaro Yoga || || 
|-
| –2014 || Hellsing Ultimate || Tom, Wild Geese, Vatican Officers || As Todd Stone || 
|-
| –2013 || Shakugan no Shana || Khamsin Nbh'w || Funimation dub || 
|-
|2012–2014
|Bleach
|Moe Shishigawari ||
|-
|  || Naruto: Shippuden || Animal Path (Nagato) / Genin Rain Shinobi || || Resume
|-
|  || Tenkai Knights || Ceylan Jones / Tributon || || Resume
|-
|  || B-Daman Crossfire || Alba Cocodoro || As Todd Stone || 
|-
|  || Blood-C || Dog || || 
|-
|  || Toriko || Takimaru || || 
|-
|  || Accel World || Crimson Kingbolt || As Todd Stone || 
|-
|  || K Project series || Izumo Kusanagi| Kosuke Fujishima || || 
|-
|  || Guilty Crown || Kurosu Ouma || || 
|-
|  || Eureka Seven: AO || Truth || || 
|-
| , 2017 || Future Diary || Aru Akise || Also Redial in 2017 || 
|-
|  || Magi: The Labyrinth of Magic series || Judar || || 
|-
|  || Good Luck Girl! || Momo'o Inugami || || 
|-
|  || Aesthetica of a Rogue Hero || Phil Barnett || || 
|-
|  || Ikki Tousen: Great Guardians || En'in || Ep. 2 || 
|-
|2013
|Sword Art Online
|Nobuyuki Sugou / Oberon
|
|
|-
|  || Digimon Fusion || Puppetmon, Metalmamemon, others || || 
|-
| –2015 || Kill la Kill || Shiro Iori || Also OVA || 
|-
|  || Sushi Ninja || Maguro || || 
|-
|  || Space Dandy || Carpaccio || ||
|-
| –19 || Attack on Titan || Marlowe || || 
|-
|  || Code:Breaker || Toki Fujiwara || || 
|-
|  || Knights of Sidonia || Norio Kunato || || 
|-
| –2015 || Sailor Moon || Jadeite || Viz dub || 
|-
|  || Tokyo Ghoul series || Ayato Kirishima || || 
|-
|  || The Disappearance of Nagato Yuki-chan || Yukata Tamaru || Ep. 8Co-ADR Director || 
|-
|  || Free! - Iwatobi Swim Club series || Haruka Nanase || || 
|-
|  || Aldnoah.Zero || Trillam || Eps. 1–3 || 
|-
|  || Fate/stay night: Unlimited Blade Works || Assassin || TV series || 
|-
|  || Attack on Titan: Junior High || Marlowe || Co-Assistant ADR Director || 
|-
| –2016 || Sailor Moon Crystal || Jadeite || || 
|-
|  || Daimidaler the Sound Robot || Shouma Ameku || || 
|-
| -2016 || Glitter Force || Pop || || 
|-
|  || Snow White with the Red Hair || Raj Schenazade || || 
|-
|  || Prince of Stride: Alternative || Tomoe Yagami || || 
|-
| –2018 || Dagashi Kashi || Kokonotsu Shikada || 2 seasons || 
|-
|  || Grimgar of Fantasy and Ash || Kikkawa || || 
|-
|  || Brothers Conflict || Hikaru Asahina || || 
|-
|  || Ajin: Demi-Human || Tosaki || || 
|-
|  || Shōnen Maid || Keiichirō Shinozaki || || 
|-
|  || One Punch Man || Drive Knight || || 
|-
|  || Danganronpa 3: The End of Hope's Peak High School || Teruteru Hanamura || Also in the Hope Arc special || 
|-
|  || Show By Rock!! # || Deyan || Ep. 7 || 
|-
|  || Aquarion Logos || Akira Kaibuki || || 
|-
|  || Kuromukuro || Tom Borden || || 
|-
|2016
|March Comes In like a Lion
|Toji Soya ||
|-
|2017
|Dragon Ball Super
|Jaco ||
|-
|  || Fūka || Yamato Akitsuki || || 
|-
|  || Rio: Rainbow Gate! || Mr. Clark || || 
|-
|  || Gosick || Wong Kai || || 
|-
|  || Samurai Warriors || Takatora Todo || || 
|-
|  || Hunter × Hunter || Genthru || 2011 version || 
|-
|  || Glitter Force Doki Doki || Riva || ADR Director || 
|-
|  || The Testament of Sister New Devil || Takashi Hayase || || 
|-
|  || The Ancient Magus' Bride || Lindel || || 
|-
|  || Black Clover || Salim de Hapsass || || 
|-
|  || Mobile Suit Gundam Thunderbolt: Bandit Flower || Billy Hickam || || 
|-
|  || Ai No Kusabi: The Space Between || Iason Mink || || 
|-
|  || Yamada-kun and the Seven Witches || Toranosuke Miyamura || || 
|-
|  || Terra Formars || Joseph Gustav Newton || || 
|-
|  || Pop Team Epic || Popuko || Ep. 6b || 
|-
|  || Re:Zero − Starting Life in Another World || Petelgeuse Romanée-Conti || || Tweet
|-
|  || Katsugeki/Touken Ranbu || Mikazuki Munechika || || 
|-
|  || Skip Beat! || Shinichi Ishibashi / Seiji Shingai || || 
|-
|  || B: The Beginning || Quinn, Jonathan || || 
|-
|  || Bungo Stray Dogs || Edgar Allan Poe || || 
|-
|  || Children of the Whales || Ouni || || 
|-
| –2023 || Aggretsuko || Komiya || || 
|-
|  || Twin Star Exorcists || Ryogo Nagitsuji || || 
|-
|  || Saint Seiya: The Lost Canvas || Hypnos || Director || 
|-
|  || Boruto: Naruto Next Generations || Shikadai Nara || || Tweet
|-
|  || Ingress: The Animation || Zion Kunikida || ||
|-
|  || Levius || Bill Weinberg || || 
|-
|  || Kengan Ashura || Setsuna Kiryū || || 
|-
|  || Marvel Future Avengers || Bruno/Twister, The Hood || ADR Director || 
|-
|  || Drifting Dragons || Niko  || ||
|-
|  || Dorohedoro || Asu / Kawajiri || ||
|-
|2020 || My Hero Academia || Hiroshi Tameda || Season 4 ||
|-
|  || High-Rise Invasion || Kazuma Aohara || ||
|-
|  || Pretty Boy Detective Club || Lai Fudatsuki || || 
|-
|  || Blue Period || Haruka Hashida || ADR Director || 
|-
|  || Komi Can't Communicate || Tsukasa Aizawa || || 
|-
|  || Bastard!! Heavy Metal, Dark Fantasy || Efreet || || 
|-
|  || Tekken: Bloodline || Hwoarang || || 
|-
|2022
|Bleach: Thousand-Year Blood War
|Ikkaku Madarame
|
|
|-
|  || JoJo's Bizarre Adventure: Stone Ocean || Ungalo || || 
|-}

|}

Animation

Film

|
|Mis/Identity
|Titus 
|

Video games

Live-action

Audiobook

References

External links

 
 Todd Haberkorn at CrystalAcids Anime Voice Actor Database
 
 
 

Living people
American male film actors
American male television actors
American male video game actors
American male voice actors
Audiobook narrators
Male actors from Dallas
Male actors from Texas
Male actors from Los Angeles
People from Arlington, Texas
People from Los Angeles
Southern Methodist University alumni
American voice directors
Year of birth missing (living people)
21st-century American male actors
American people of Vietnamese descent
American people of Scandinavian descent
Male actors of Vietnamese descent